Karnal Aerodrome is being operated as a pilot training institute owned and operated by Haryana Institute of Civil Aviation (HICA) under guidance of Civil Aviation Department, Government of Haryana. The flying school is spread over an area of 104 acres and is situated about 3 km east of Karnal in the state of Haryana, India.

Karnal Flying Club was established in the year 1967 by the Civil Aviation Department of Haryana and is one of the bases of Haryana Institute of Civil Aviation (HICA). Other than this, the airfield is often used by Haryana Government as well as VIP charter aircraft and helicopters.

History

In 1948, first airstrip was built in Haryana when Ambala Air Force Station was established. In 1967, Karnal Air Strip was set up. The Karnal Flying Club has been running at this airfield since 1967 year .

In 2012, The (DGCA) approved the Haryana state government's plans to develop the  Airport to operate Domestic Passenger Services in August 2013. Karnal Aerodrome small runway, just 3,000-feet-long and 150-feet-wide, will be extended to 4,500 feet in the first phase and then up to 6,000 feet to accommodate ATR Turboprops and jets. Installation of Runway lighting was taken up by the State Public Works Department after the DGCA gave approval for night flying in July 2012.

Infrastructure 

Karnal Aerodrome is spread over an area of 104 acres which includes a runway strip of 3000'×150', an administrative block, one hangar of size 100'×75', a class room, library, a VIP Lounge, a hostel and two residential quarters for the officers and staff.  As of 2018, it had two four-seater Cessna-172 R and two two-seater Cessna 152 FA aircraft. The apron area can easily accommodate 10 - 12 small aircraft at any given time. HICA at Karnal also has two flight simulator, one IPT-ATC 710 single engine and another Elite S712 single- & multi-engine Simulator. It also has two designated helipads. There are no radio navigational aids available at the airfield, the runway orientation is 130° – 310° (13–31). Currently, the airfield is only limited to Day operations but no night operations. The ATC is uncontrolled and is operated at the frequency of 122.5 Mhz. Installation of runway lighting was taken up by the State Public Works Department after the DGCA gave approval for night flying in July, 2012. The airport has day and DGCA-approved night-landing facilities.

Courses offered at Karnal Aviation Club 
Haryana Institute of Civil Aviation (HICA) is one of the Directorate General of Civil Aviation (India) approved Flying Training Organizations (FTOs) in the country which provides pilot training to the trainee pilots. The institution conducts flying training and preparation courses leading to the award of Student Pilot License (SPL), Glider Pilot License, Private Pilot Licence (PPL), Commercial Pilot Licence (CPL), Flight Radio Telephony Operator License (FRTOL), Flight Instructor Rating (AFIR/FIR), Instrument Rating (IR) and apprentice internship for all BE/BTech students.

Presently, the Dy. Chief Flying Instructor of Pinjore Flying Club is Capt. Sunil Gill. The CPL costs approx. INR 25,00,000 requiring a minimum of 200 hours' flying experience. The Government of Haryana provides training subsidies to natives Haryana, who must apply for it using a Haryana Domicile Certificate. As of January, 2021, over 45 students are currently enrolled at Karnal Aviation Club for the flying training of Commercial Pilot License (CPL) and Private Pilot License (PPL).

Currently, HICA operates two Cessna 172s and two Cessna 152s on this airfield with the following registrations -

Future development
Captain Abhimanyu, Finance Minister of Haryana, while presenting the Government of Haryana 2018-19 budget in March 2018 announced  that the funds have been allocated to extend the existing 3000 feet runway to 6000 feet and parking hangar for the spillover aircraft from IGI Delhi airport will be constructed.

See also

 List of airports in India
 Airports Authority of India
 List of busiest airports in India
 List of Indian Air Force bases
 List of highways in Haryana
 Railway in Haryana

References 

Karnal
Airports in Haryana
Flying clubs
Aviation schools in Haryana
Government of Haryana
Airports established in 1967
1967 establishments in Haryana
20th-century architecture in India